Zagir Mukhtarpashaevich Shakhiev (born 15 April 1999) is a Russian freestyle wrestler who competes at 65 kilograms. Shakhiev is the reigning World Champion and European Champion, as well as a two-time Russian National medalist and a Cadet World Champion.

Career 
Shakiev, of Chechen descent, started wrestling at the age of eight, and went on to become the 2016 Cadet World Champion at 46 kilograms. After competing at some international tournaments in Russia and Armenia, he broke into the senior level scene in 2020, claiming a bronze medal from the 2020 Russian National Championships, and followed the roll by claiming a silver medal in 2021, only losing to reigning World Champion from Dagestan Gadzhimurad Rashidov in the finals. After his performance at the 2021 Russian Nationals, Sakhiev claimed the 2021 European Continental Championship in April.

As a replacement for returning World Champion Gadzhimurad Rashidov, Sakhiev travelled to Norway in order to compete at the 2021 World Championships from 3 to 4 October. An underdog to win the championship, he battled on his way to the finale, notably defeating former Junior and University World Champion Selahattin Kılıçsallayan and '19 U23 Asian champion Tömör-Ochiryn Tulga to advance to the next date. Sakhiev dominated over Amir Mohammad Yazdani to claim the crown and become the 2021 World Champion on 4 October.

In 2022, he won the silver medal in his event at the Yasar Dogu Tournament held in Istanbul, Turkey.

Major results

References

External links 
 

Living people
Place of birth missing (living people)
Russian male sport wrestlers
European Wrestling Championships medalists
1999 births
People from Khasavyurt
Chechen sportsmen
European Wrestling Champions
Sportspeople from Dagestan
20th-century Russian people
21st-century Russian people